The  is the nickname of the  in Kure, Hiroshima, Japan.

History
The museum opened on April 23, 2005.  It is nicknamed the Yamato Museum due to the display in the lobby of a 1/10 scale model of the battleship Yamato, the flagship of the Japanese Combined Fleet in World War II. It was sunk south of the Japanese island of Kyushu in 1945. The museum is located where the battleship was completed.

Museum

Exhibition rooms
Yamato Hiroba – 1/10 scale of the  
History of Kure – as the shipbuilding, port city and the Kure Naval District
Large objects exhibition room - containing a Mitsubishi A6M Zero model 62, a Kaiten human torpedo and a Kairyū-class submarine
1:1 replica of one of the battleship Kongō's boilers. 
Chibi Yamato replica
Collection of suicide notes from Kaiten pilots, as well as sword, will and photographs.
Type 93 torpedo
16 inch shells and shell replicas for the Mutsu and Nagato
18 inch shells and shell replicas for the Yamato and Musashi (and the converted Shinano)
Shipbuilding technology, including simulator, bouncy display device and cargo ship replica bow
The Yamato in culture, references many anime and movies in particular the "Space Battleship Yamato" series
Yamato theatre, which shows many films related to the IJN every day.
1:1 scale replica of the Yamato's bridge (not on display any more)
Future prospects

Other rooms
The museum includes an experiment work room, library, citizens' gallery, meeting rooms, and  gift shop, and an observation terrace on the 4th floor where people can view the area.

Outside
Outside the museum there is a brick park, a lawn plaza, and Yamato Wharf. The Japan Maritime Self-Defence Force Kure Museum, which includes the retired JMSDF Yūshio-class submarine Akishio (SS-579) and a rudder and screw of the Japanese Battleship Mutsu is located next to the Yamato Museum.

Yamato wreckage
The sunken Yamato was surveyed previously, but in May 2015, digital technology was used for the first time. The footage shows many identifiable parts of the wreckage, such as the chrysanthemum crest on the bow, one of the -diameter propellers, and a detached main gun turret. The museum plans to show the nine-minute video repeatedly in its theater.

Museum partnership
In 2015, the museum announced that it had entered into a sister museum partnership with the USS Missouri Memorial Association in Pearl Harbor, Hawaii. The agreement commemorates the 70th anniversary of the end of World War II.

Access
JR Kure Station
Kure City bus "Youmetown Yamato Museum-mae" bus stop
Kure Port

See also
 Kure Naval Arsenal
 Kure Naval District
 Yamato (film)

References

External links

Yamato Museum (homepage, in English)
Recreated battleship bridge on display at Yamato Museum - Asahi Shimbun, July 27, 2013

Museums established in 2005
Maritime museums in Japan
Military and war museums in Japan
Museums in Hiroshima Prefecture
2005 establishments in Japan
Kure, Hiroshima